Semic Interprint, now known as Adoc-Semic, is a Hungarian publishing company, located in Budapest. It publishes mainly translated Hungarian comics and magazines. It has been the main comics company in Hungary, and the only source for American comics in the country for over a decade.

Publishing history
Formed in 1988, it started as a Hungarian-Swedish joint venture, incorporating the Swedish Semic Press and the former Hungarian publisher Interprint. It took over former titles and introduced a whole series of American and European comics, never before seen in Hungary, including Spider-Man, Batman, Superman, and The Phantom. Publishing peaked in 1991, when the company put out more than 120 books a year.

After the success of the three well-known American titles, new ones got introduced, such as Transformers, the X-Men, and Marvel Extra, which featured the Avengers, Fantastic Four, Daredevil, and many more. Others were Teenage Mutant Ninja Turtles (Mirage comics), RoboCop, Garfield, and Calvin and Hobbes. Kretén featured mainly works of Hungarian artists; later it translated some material from MAD. Some older ones were forced into joint bi-monthly titles like Batman and Superman. Besides the growing number of comics, there were also unsuccessful moves like the short-lived X-07 magazine, which was meant to feature Franco-Belgian comics like XIII and Largo Winch.

At the end of the 1990s, financial disputes with Marvel Comics (which at that time was bankrupt) led to the cancellations of Marvel Extra, X-Men, and the Transformers, leaving only Spider-Man as the last Marvel character in the country. After this, Semic Interprint turned to Dark Horse Comics and Image Comics. X-Files, Spawn, and Star Wars were launched in 1997. X-Files got canceled after one year, and Spawn in 1999 together with Spider-Man, leaving the county with practically no comics.

In 1999 the company introduced the first manga published in Hungary, namely Dragon Ball, Video Girl Ai, and Sailor Moon. The first two were manga-sized 52 page, monthly titles; Sailor Moon featured the colored Animanga version in a 52-page comic book-sized edition. The ban on Dragonball in Hungarian TV broadcasting had a diminishing effect on the spread of anime and manga at that time, and after the cancellation of Video Girl Ai and Sailor Moon, Dragon Ball also got sacked.

The next big move for the company was the introduction of the hit US comic series Ultimate Spider-Man. Titled Csodálatos Pókember in Hungarian, it got the same title as its predecessor in hope of wider recognition among older comic fans. 2001 also featured a sad event. DC's last representatives, Superman & Batman, disappeared from the news stands.

The years since can be dubbed stagnation at the company. No new regular titles, few one-shots like the Batman movie adaptation got published, but no big investments.

With the Appearance of Panini Comics in Hungary, which also publishes American comics, Semic chose to make Csodálatos Pókember a monthly title.

Adoc-Semic products are available at newsstands (there is no direct market for comics in Hungary). Some back issues are still available from the publisher.

Published titles

Sources

External links
 Semic Interprint's official site

Comic book publishing companies of Hungary
Mass media in Budapest
Publishing companies established in 1988